Pressure urticaria  is a physical urticaria caused by pressure applied to the skin, and is characterized by the development of swelling and pain that usually occurs 3 to 12 hours after local pressure has been applied.

See also 
 Urticaria
 Skin lesion
 List of cutaneous conditions

References

External links 

Urticaria and angioedema